Alboury Lah (born 23 April 1966) is a former Senegal international football forward.

Career
Born in Thiès, Lah began playing football for local side Rail de Thiès. Next, he joined ASC Diaraf where he would win the 1989 national championship.

Lah joined Paris Saint-Germain F.C. in 1989, and would make six Ligue 1 appearances for the club. PSG loaned him to Ligue 2 sides En Avant de Guingamp and LB Châteauroux before he left the club in 1993.

Lah made several appearances for the Senegal national football team, and played at the 1992 African Cup of Nations finals.

Club Career Stats

References

External links
Profile at PSG70.fr

1966 births
Living people
Sportspeople from Thiès
Association football forwards
Senegalese footballers
Senegal international footballers
1992 African Cup of Nations players
ASC Jaraaf players
Paris Saint-Germain F.C. players
En Avant Guingamp players
LB Châteauroux players
Ligue 1 players
Ligue 2 players
Senegalese expatriate footballers
Expatriate footballers in France
Senegalese expatriate sportspeople in France